West Sea or Western Sea may refer to:

Yellow Sea
Atlantic Ocean
Pacific Ocean 
Indian Ocean
Mediterranean Sea
Yellow Sea, as used in Korea
Baltic Sea, the English translation of the Estonian name for the sea 
North Sea, the English translation of an alternative Danish name for the sea 
Qinghai Lake, the English translation of an alternative Chinese name for the lake and one of the Four Seas 
Xihai (disambiguation) (西海), translated into English as West Sea
West Sea Barrage, Nampho, North Korea

See also

 Western Sea (disambiguation)
 North Sea (disambiguation)
 East Sea (disambiguation)
 South Sea (disambiguation)
 
 
 West (disambiguation)
 Sea (disambiguation)